Yassine Moudatir (born 29 July 1988, Al Fida) is a Moroccan judoka who competes in the men's 60 kg category. At the 2012 Summer Olympics, he was defeated in the second round by Valtteri Jokinen.

He won the African Championships in his division in 2010, 2012, 2013 and 2015.  He also won the bronze in 2014.

References

Moroccan male judoka
Living people
Olympic judoka of Morocco
Judoka at the 2012 Summer Olympics
1988 births
Sportspeople from Casablanca
Mediterranean Games gold medalists for Morocco
Mediterranean Games medalists in judo
Competitors at the 2013 Mediterranean Games
20th-century Moroccan people
21st-century Moroccan people